or Joan of Arc (1412–1431) was a French soldier and religious leader.

Jeanne d'Arc may also refer to:

Football clubs
 Jeanne d'Arc Poiré, France
 Jeanne d'Arc FC, Mali
 SS Jeanne d'Arc, Réunion 
 ASC Jeanne d'Arc, Senegal

Music
Jeanne d'Arc (Braunfels opera)
 "Jeanne d'Arc au bûcher", a 1938 Honegger oratorio
 Jeanne d'Arc (Thy Majestie album), 2005
 Jeanne d'Arc (Tangerine Dream album), 2005

Places
 Sainte-Jeanne-d'Arc, Bas-Saint-Laurent, Quebec, Canada
 Sainte-Jeanne-d'Arc, Saguenay–Lac-Saint-Jean, Quebec, Canada
 Sainte Jeanne d'Arc Church (Nice), France
 Péninsule Jeanne d'Arc, Kerguelen Islands

Ships
 French corvette Jeanne d'Arc, a wooden-hulled armored corvette built for the French Navy in the late 1860s
 French cruiser Jeanne d'Arc (1899), an armoured cruiser of the French Navy
 French cruiser Jeanne d'Arc (1930), a school cruiser of the French Navy
 French cruiser Jeanne d'Arc (R97), a 1961 helicopter cruiser

Other uses
 Jeanne d'Arc (video game), a 2006 tactical role-playing game
 Jeanne d’Arc School, a defunct school in Tehran, Iran
 Jeanne d'Arc station, an OC Transpo station in Canada
 Rue Jeanne d'Arc, a street in Beirut, Lebanon

See also
 Arc (disambiguation)
 French ship Jeanne d'Arc, a list of ships of the French navy
 Janne Da Arc (band), a Japanese band
 Jeanne (disambiguation)
 Joan of Arc (disambiguation)
 Sainte-Jeanne-d'Arc (disambiguation)